The National Land Surveying and Mapping Center (NLSC) is the agency of the Ministry of the Interior of the Republic of China (Taiwan) responsible for survey and registration of land.

History
The NLSC was originally established as Wasteland Survey Headquarter, Land Administrative Bureau, Department of Civil Affairs, Chief Executive Office, Taiwan Province in February 1947 of the Taiwan Provincial Government. It was then renamed to Survey Headquarter, Land Administrative Bureau, Department of Civil Affairs, Taiwan Provincial in 1953 and once more to Survey Headquarter, Land Administrative Bureau, Taiwan Provincial in February 1963. It was promoted to Survey Headquarter, Land Administrative Office, Taiwan Provincial in 1979 and reorganized to become Land Survey Bureau, Land Administrative Office, Taiwan Provincial on 3 July 1992.

With the streamlining of Taiwan Province, the bureau became the subordinate of the Ministry of the Interior and was renamed Land Survey Bureau on 1 July 1999 and reorganized into the National Land Surveying and Mapping Center on 16 November 2007.

Organizational structures
 Planning and Technology Section
 Control Survey Section
 Cadastral Survey Section
 Topographic and Hydrographic Survey Section
 Survey Information Section
 Secretariat Office
 Civil Services Ethics Office
 Survey Team

See also
 Ministry of the Interior (Taiwan)

References

External links

 

1947 establishments in Taiwan
Executive Yuan
Government agencies established in 1947
Organizations based in Taichung
Topography